Pierre Desrochers is a city councillor in Montreal, Quebec, Canada. He represents the Saint-Sulpice District in the borough of Ahuntsic-Cartierville. Desrochers is also the chair of the Montreal Executive Committee. He was first elected in the 2013 municipal election. He is a member of Équipe Denis Coderre pour Montréal.

Career
Desrochers is a former management and strategic communications consultant, working primarily in the oil industry, in which he served as the Director of Corporate and Public Affairs for Eastern Canada at Imperial Oil.

He was also chairman of the Hôpital Maisonneuve-Rosemont, and sat on the board of several non-profit and governmental organizations.

References

Living people
Montreal city councillors
Canadian management consultants
21st-century Canadian politicians
Year of birth missing (living people)